The Bradley Lake Trail is a  long round-trip hiking trail in Grand Teton National Park in the U.S. state of Wyoming. The trail is accessed from the Taggart Lake trailhead and provides access to Bradley Lake, with views of the lake and the Teton Range. At Bradley lake, the trail intercepts the Valley Trail which heads north towards Garnet Canyon or south to Taggart Lake.

See also
 List of hiking trails in Grand Teton National Park

References

Hiking trails of Grand Teton National Park